Pyrausta dapalis is a moth in the family Crambidae. It was described by Augustus Radcliffe Grote in 1881. It is found in western North America, where it has been recorded from California and Oregon.

The length of the forewings is 7–9.5 mm. Adults have been recorded on wing from early January to March.

The larvae have been reared on various Salvia species.

References

Moths described in 1881
dapalis
Moths of North America